Phenylpiracetam (INN: fonturacetam, brand names Phenotropil Фенотропил, Carphedon), is a phenylated analog of the drug piracetam.  It was developed in 1983 as a medication for Soviet Cosmonauts to treat the prolonged stresses of working in space. Phenylpiracetam was created at the Russian Academy of Sciences Institute of Biomedical Problems in an effort led by psychopharmacologist Valentina Ivanovna Akhapkina (Валентина Ивановна Ахапкина).  In Russia  it is now available as a prescription drug. Research on animals has indicated that phenylpiracetam may have anti-amnesic, antidepressant, anticonvulsant, anxiolytic, and memory enhancement effects.

Human research
Phenylpiracetam is typically prescribed as a general stimulant or to increase tolerance to extreme temperatures and stress.

A few small clinical studies have shown possible links between prescription of phenylpiracetam and improvement in a number of encephalopathic conditions, including lesions of cerebral blood pathways, traumatic brain injury and certain types of glioma.

Phenylpiracetam has been researched for the treatment of Parkinson's disease.

Clinical trials were conducted at the Serbsky State Scientific Center for Social and Forensic Psychiatry. The Serbsky Center, Moscow Institute of Psychiatry, and Russian Center of Vegetative Pathology are reported  to have confirmed the effectiveness of Phenylpiracetam(Phenytropil) describing the following effects: improvement of regional blood flow in ischemic regions of the brain, reduction of depressive and anxiety disorders, increase the resistance of brain tissue to hypoxia and toxic effects, improving concentration and mental activity, a psychoactivating(sic) effect, increase in the threshold of pain sensitivity, improvement in the quality of sleep, and an anticonvulsant action, though with the side effect of an anorexic effect in extended use.

Animal Model Research 
Phenylpiracetam has been shown to reverse the depressant effects of the benzodiazepine diazepam, increases operant behavior, inhibits post-rotational nystagmus, prevents retrograde amnesia, and has anticonvulsant properties in animal models.

In Wistar rats with gravitational cerebral ischemia, Phenylpiracetam reduced the extent of neuralgic deficiency manifestations, retained the locomotor, research, and memory functions, increased the survival rate, and lead to the favoring of local cerebral flow restoration upon the occlusion of carotid arteries to a greater extent than did piracetam.

Operant behavior 
Phenylpiracetam is known to increase operant behavior. In tests against a control, Sprague-Dawley rats given free access to less-preferred rat chow and trained to operate a lever repeatedly to obtain preferred rat chow performed additional work when given methylphenidate, d-amphetamine, and phenylpiracetam. Rats administered 100 mg/kg phenylpiracetam performed, on average, 375% more work than rats given placebo, and consumed little non-preferred rat chow. In comparison, rats administered 1mg/kg d-amphetamine or 10 mg/kg methylphenidate performed, on average, 150% and 170% more work respectively, and consumed half as much non-preferred rat chow.

Pharmacology

Phenylpiracetam binds to α4β2 nicotinic acetylcholine receptors in the
mouse brain cortex with IC50 = 5.86 μM.

Experiments performed on Sprague-Dawley rats in a European patent for using Phenylpiracetam to treat sleep disorders showed an increase in extracellular dopamine levels after administration.  The patent asserts discovery of phenylpiracetam's action as a dopamine reuptake inhibitor as its basis.

Both enantiomers of phenylpiracetam have been described in peer-reviewed research as dopamine transporter (DAT) inhibitors in rodents, confirming the patent claim. Their action at the noradrenaline transporter vary: the R enantiomer acts as a noradrenaline reuptake inhibitor (thus, an NDRI) with 11-fold lower affinity to NET than to DAT, while the S enantiomer has no such effect.

History 
Pilot-cosmonaut Aleksandr Serebrov described being issued and using Phenylpiracetam, as well as it being included in the Soyuz spacecraft's standard emergency medical kit, during his 197-days working in space aboard the Mir space station.  He reported "the drug acts as the equalizer of the whole organism, "combs" it(sic причесывает), completely excluding impulsiveness and irritability inevitable in the stressful conditions of space flight."

Availability

While not prescribed as a pharmaceutical in the West, in Russia it was available as a prescription medicine under the name Phenotropil. It was discontinued in April 2017 due to licensing issues. 

Phenylpiracetam is not scheduled by the U.S. Drug Enforcement Administration.

Athlete doping
Phenylpiracetam has been shown to posses a stimulant action in animal models and thus appears on the list of stimulants banned for in-competition use by the World Anti-Doping Agency. This list is applicable in all Olympic sports.

See also 
 Doping in sport
 Methylphenylpiracetam, a methylated analog
 Phenylpiracetam hydrazide
 Phensuximide, a succinimide analog
 Racetams
 Phenibut, also included in cosmonaut medical kits

References 

Acetamides
Drugs in sport
Drugs in the Soviet Union
Nicotinic agonists
Nootropics
Norepinephrine–dopamine reuptake inhibitors
Phenyl compounds
Racetams
Russian drugs
Russian inventions
Stimulants
World Anti-Doping Agency prohibited substances